The 2005-06 curling season began in September 2005 and ended in April 2006.

Season of Champions top three finishes
(Only team's skip listed)

Other events

CCA ranking events

Men's

Women's

*Non-Canadians who win events are not counted in the rankings.
**Non eligible team

WCT Money Ranking

See also
2006-07 curling season

Sources
Canadian Curling Association
World Curling Federation

Seasons in curling